Wedge Face is a descriptive name for the prominent wedge-shaped rock spur that projects from Mount Patrick into the eastern part of Beardmore Glacier. This feature was almost surely observed by Shackleton's Southern Journey Party on its ascent of the Beardmore Glacier in December 1908. It was named by the South Pole Party of the British Antarctic Expedition, 1910–13, under Robert Scott.

Ridges of the Ross Dependency
Shackleton Coast